Country Alliance may refer to:
Australian Federation Party, a political party in Australia formerly known as the Country Alliance
Country Alliance (Dominican Republic), a political party in the Dominican Republic
Countryside Alliance, a British organisation
PAIS Alliance, a political alliance in Ecuador